David or Dave Jacoby may refer to:
 David Jacoby (politician)
 David Jacoby (sportscaster)
 Dave Jacoby (powerlifter)